Offiziersstellvertreter, short OStv (en: Officer deputy), is a rank of the higher non-commissioned officers rank group (also staff NCO group) in the Austrian Bundesheer and Imperial German Army.

See also
Ranks of the Austrian Bundesheer

Austria-Hungaria (until 1918) 
In 1915 the position Offiziersstellvertreter was introduced to the Austro-Hungarian armed forces, at the time being not as rank, but as an assignment. It was the intention to equalise the high number of World War I losses. Promoted were staff NCOs (Stabsfeldwebel, Stabswachtmeister, Stabsfeuerwerker, and/or Stabsoberjäger) who did have the appropriate rank at least for one month. Together with the staff NCOs the Offiziersstellvertreter formed the rank group of higher NCOs (de: higher Unteroffiziere).

See also
Rank insignias of the Austro-Hungarian armed forces

German Empire and the Weimar Republic
The rank was created in the Imperial German Army in 1887.

References 

Die Streitkräfte der Republik Österreich, 1918-1968, Heeresgeschichtliches Museum, Militärwissenschaftliches Institut, 1968

Military ranks of Austria